The Rae Flats and The Raleigh, also known as The Phoenix; The Hotel Raleigh; The Tudor Arms; The Phoenix Apartments, are two historic apartment buildings located in the Allentown neighborhood of Buffalo, Erie County, New York. The Rae was built about 1892, and is a three-story, polychromatic brick building over a raised basement with Norman inspired detailing. The Rae houses a total of seven apartments.  The Raleigh was built about 1896 as a Jewish clubhouse and converted to apartments in 1901. It is a four-story, Romanesque Revival style brick building that houses 28 apartments.

It was listed on the National Register of Historic Places in 2016.

References

Jews and Judaism in Buffalo, New York
Residential buildings on the National Register of Historic Places in New York (state)
Romanesque Revival architecture in New York (state)
Residential buildings completed in 1892
Buildings and structures in Buffalo, New York
National Register of Historic Places in Buffalo, New York